Ilan Shiloah (also anglicised as Shiloach) is an Israeli businessman. He is the former CEO and chairman of McCann Erickson-Kesher-Barel, Israel's largest advertising firm. He is the chairman of The Time; a technology startups investment company. During 2003-2011, Shiloah has served on the Executive Board of McCann Erickson EMEA. Since he sold his holdings in 2011, he serves as a board member at Mccan TLV.

Biography
Ilan Shiloah was born in Maoz Haim, a kibbutz in northern Israel. Drafted to the army in 1977, he served in the Special Forces unit Sayeret Matkal. After completing his service, Shiloah obtained a BA in Economics & Management from Tel Aviv University. He also earned his MBA there.

Shiloah is twice divorced and has four daughters. He is married to Shira Margalit, daughter of Dan Margalit. Shiloah lives in Tel Aviv.

Business career
In 1995, Shiloah was appointed as the CEO of Kesher-Barel, which later became McCann Erickson Israel (now part of McCann WorldGroup). Between the years 2009-2011 Shiloah sold his shares in the company to the global McCann Erickson Worldgroup.

Shiloah is the co-founder, major shareholder and chairman of The Time; an investment company founded in 2009 focusing on young innovative technology startups in the areas of new media (T.I.M.E).

In 2015, Channel 10, of which Shiloah was a minority shareholder, entered financial difficulties and Shiloah attempted to take full control of the broadcaster in return for taking on the existing debts of around NIS 200 million. Shiloah's offer was rejected in favour of an offer by RGE.

Shiloah is chairman of Silenseed, a clinical stage biopharmaceutical company.

References

1957 births
People from Maoz Haim
Living people
Israeli advertising executives
Tel Aviv University alumni